This is a list of years in Norwegian television.

Twenty-first century

Twentieth century

See also 
 List of years in Norway
 Lists of Norwegian films
 List of years in television

Television, Norwegian
 
Norwegian television
Norwegian television-related lists